Sonawari Assembly constituency is located in Bandipura district of Jammu and Kashmir. Sonawari assembly constituency is part of the Baramulla parliamentary area. There were  voters in the Sonawari constituency in 2014. It has been represented by JKNC candidate Mohammad Akbar Lone since 2002. In the 2014 assembly elections, Lone won the election from the constituency by defeating PDP candidate Yasser Rashy by 406 votes.

Member of Legislative Assembly

Election results

2014

Previous

References 

Assembly constituencies of Jammu and Kashmir
Bandipora district